Apamea griveaudi is a moth of the family Noctuidae. It is found in northern Madagascar.

Its wingspan ranges from 40 to 55 mm, and the length of the forewings is 19.5 to 27 mm. This species is also nocturnal.

References

Apamea (moth)
Moths of Madagascar
Endemic fauna of Madagascar
Moths described in 1967
Taxa named by Pierre Viette